Walter Peter Swanwick (29 September 1922 – 14 November 1968) was a British actor best remembered as the "Supervisor" (sometimes called the Controller) in the 1967 TV series, The Prisoner.

Swanwick's film career began with bit parts in films such as The African Queen (1951), and he became a recognisable face on British TV during the mid-1960s when he featured in a number of series, including The Avengers and Danger Man where he first worked with later Prisoner star and co-creator, Patrick McGoohan.

According to several biographies  Swanwick endured major health problems in the 1960s that resulted in his undergoing undisclosed operations that left him with a short time to live.

Swanwick played the non-singing part of Herr Zeller in the original London stage production of The Sound of Music.

Selected filmography

 Lilli Marlene (1950) - Chief Interrogator
 Madame Louise (1951) - Bradford businessman (uncredited)
 The African Queen (1951) - First Officer of Fort Shona
 Old Mother Riley's Jungle Treasure (1951) - Mr. Benson
 Salute the Toff (1952) - Night Porter (uncredited)
 Private Information (1952) - Minor Role (uncredited)
 Emergency Call (1952) - Police Sergeant
 Time Gentlemen, Please! (1952) - Jeremiah Higgins
 No Haunt for a Gentleman (1952) - Brother Ravioli
 Circumstantial Evidence (1952) - Charley Pott
 Lady in the Fog (1952) - Smithers
 Cosh Boy (1953) - Mr. Wimbush (uncredited)
 Street Corner (1953) - Mr. Propert (uncredited)
 The Red Beret (1953) - Minor Role (uncredited)
 Albert R.N. (1953) - Obergefreiter
 Stryker of the Yard (1953) 
 Devil on Horseback (1954) - Mr. Parfitt
 Conflict of Wings (1954) - Sergeant, Working Party
 Betrayed (1954) - Fat Major (uncredited)
 The Black Rider (1954) - Holiday-maker
 Delavine Affair (1955) - Meyerling
 The Colditz Story (1955) - Lutyens 
 The Love Match (1955) - Mr. Hall
 Windfall (1955) - (uncredited)
 Passport to Treason (1955) - Cafe Proprietor
 The March Hare (1956) - Nils Svenson
 Bond of Fear (1956) - Travelling Salesman
 Assignment Redhead (1956) - Mons. Paul Bonnet
 Ill Met by Moonlight (1957) - German Officer with Gen. Brauer (uncredited)
 You Pay Your Money (1957) - Hall Porter
 Murder Reported (1957) - Hatter
 Kill Me Tomorrow (1957) - Harrison
 The Big Chance (1957) - Passport Official
 Death Over My Shoulder (1958) - Nick Dayton
 The Two-Headed Spy (1958) - Gen. Toppe
 Operation Amsterdam (1959) - Peter
 Life in Danger (1959) - Dr. Nichols
 The Desperate Man (1959) - Hoad
 Circus of Horrors (1960) - German Police Inspector Knopf
 The Trunk (1961) - Nicholas Steiner
 Double Bunk (1961) - Freighter Pilot
 The Devil's Daffodil (1961) - Polizist (uncredited)
 Invasion Quartet (1961) - Gun Commander
 Fate Takes a Hand (1961) - Preeny
 Mystery Submarine (1963) - Lt. Lyncker
 The Gentle Terror (1963) - 1st Auditor
 Secrets of a Windmill Girl (1966) - Len Mason
 The Devil Rides Out (1968) - Satanist (uncredited)
 The Looking Glass War (1970) - Finnish Policeman (final film role)

References

External links
 

1922 births
1968 deaths
20th-century English male actors
English male stage actors
English male film actors
English male television actors
Male actors from Nottinghamshire
Actors from Nottingham